Mikołaj Pomarnacki (19 September 1934 – 11 November 2022) was a Polish fencer. He competed in the team épée event at the 1964 Summer Olympics.

He died on 11 November 2022, at the age of 88.

References

1934 births
2022 deaths
Polish male fencers
Olympic fencers of Poland
Fencers at the 1964 Summer Olympics
People from Ostrzeszów County
Sportspeople from Greater Poland Voivodeship